The Armando Iannucci Shows is a series of eight programmes directed by Armando Iannucci and written by Iannucci with Andy Riley and Kevin Cecil. It was shown on UK's Channel 4 from August to October 2001. Each episode focused on specific themes relating to human nature and existentialism, around which Iannucci would weave a series of surreal sketches and monologues.

Format 

Recurring themes in the episodes are the superficiality of modern culture, our problems communicating with each other, the mundane nature of working life and feelings of personal inadequacy and social awkwardness. Several characters also make repeat appearances in the shows, including the East End thug, who solves every problem with threats of violence; Hugh, an old man who delivers surreal monologues about what things were like in the old days; and Iannucci's barber, who is full of nonsensical anecdotes.

Recurring characters
Most of the sketches and characters in The Armando Iannucci Shows were one-offs, but a few characters did recur:

 Armando's Barber (Steve Brody) - An Italian barber who regales Armando with bizarre theories and anecdotes rather than cutting his hair.
 The East End Thug (Alan Ford) - A middle-aged cockney villain who can solve almost any problem through the medium of violent gangland threats.
 Hugh (Hugh Cecil) - an old man who visits Armando and recalls his past, his reminiscences containing a modern twist.
 The Television Executives (Tony Gardner, Darren Higham, Melanie Hudson and Stephen Mangan) - a group of TV executives unable to conceive of anything other than in terms of a TV pitch. Usually end up congratulating themselves with a conga ("We're so good at telly").

Episodes
Each episode is themed around a certain subject. The following episode order is according to the DVD which had its contents significantly reshuffled from the original broadcast timeline.

Music 
The original broadcast version featured a number of modern classical pieces including:
Spiegel im Spiegel – Arvo Pärt – Angela Yoffe and Vadim Gluzman
Shaker Loops: I. Shaking and Trembling – John Adams, London Symphony Orchestra and the Orchestra of St. Luke's
Tracery – Nusrat Fateh Ali Khan
Cantus In Memoriam Benjamin Britten – Arvo Pärt
Symphony of Sorrowful Songs, 2nd movement – Henryk Górecki

Other classical pieces included:
"The Aquarium" from The Carnival of the Animals – Camille Saint-Saëns
Serenade to Music (orchestral version) – Ralph Vaughan Williams
Wachet auf, ruft uns die Stimme – Johann Sebastian Bach
"Herr, unser Herrscher" from St John Passion – J. S. Bach

Some of these pieces had to be removed from the DVD due to rights issues, and were replaced with stock library music.

There is also a snippet of an imaginary modern opera, "Ibiza Uncovered", that is very close to the style of the opera of John Adams.

Reception 
Iannucci has been quoted as saying it is the comedy series he is most proud of making. He told The Metro in April 2007 "The Armando Iannucci Show on Channel 4 came out around 9/11, so it was overlooked for good reasons. People had other things on their minds. But that was the closest to me expressing my comic outlook on life."

The show is also notable for its use of music, the quality of its direction and the often extensive use of CGI effects. A DVD of the series was released on 4 September 2006 after years of wrangles due to music rights issues.

Empire called the show "a lesser effort, even if this does display flashes of the wit behind The Day Today and The Thick of It."

References

External links
The Armando Iannucci Shows at the former BBC Guide to Comedy

2001 British television series debuts
2001 British television series endings
2000s British comedy television series
Channel 4 comedy
English-language television shows